Howler monkeys (genus Alouatta, monotypic in subfamily Alouattinae) are the most widespread primate genus in the Neotropics and are among the largest of the platyrrhines along with the muriquis (Brachyteles), the spider monkeys (Ateles) and woolly monkeys (Lagotrix). These monkeys are native to South and Central American forests. They are famous for their loud howls, which can travel more than a mile through dense rain forest. Fifteen species are recognized. Previously classified in the family Cebidae, they are now placed in the family Atelidae. They are primarily folivores but also significant frugivores, acting as seed dispersal agents through their digestive system and their locomotion. Threats include human predation, habitat destruction, and capture for pets or zoo animals.

Classification
 A. palliata group
 Coiba Island howler, Alouatta coibensis
 Alouatta coibensis coibensis
 Azuero howler, Alouatta coibensis trabeata
 Mantled howler, Alouatta palliata
 Ecuadorian mantled howler, Alouatta palliata aequatorialis
 Golden-mantled howler, Alouatta palliata palliata
 Mexican howler monkey, Alouatta palliata mexicana
 Guatemalan black howler, Alouatta pigra
 A. seniculus group
 Ursine howler, Alouatta arctoidea
 Red-handed howler, Alouatta belzebul
 Spix's red-handed howler, Alouatta discolor
 Brown howler, Alouatta guariba
 Northern brown howler, Alouatta guariba guariba
 Southern brown howler, Alouatta guariba clamitans
 Juruá red howler, Alouatta juara
 Guyanan red howler, Alouatta macconnelli
 Amazon black howler, Alouatta nigerrima
 Purus red howler, Alouatta puruensis
 Bolivian red howler, Alouatta sara
 Venezuelan red howler, Alouatta seniculus
 Maranhão red-handed howler, Alouatta ululata
 A. caraya group
 Black howler, Alouatta caraya

Anatomy and physiology

Howler monkeys have short snouts and wide-set, round nostrils. Their noses are very keen, and they can smell out food (primarily fruit and nuts)  up to 2 km away. Their noses are usually roundish snout-type, and the nostrils have many sensory hairs growing from the interior. This is a prime characteristic. Like many New World monkeys, they have prehensile tails, which they use while picking fruit and nuts from trees. Unlike other New World monkeys, both male and female howler monkeys have trichromatic color vision. This has evolved independently from other New World monkeys due to gene duplication. They have lifespans of 15 to 20 years. Howler species are dimorphic and can also be dichromatic (i.e. Alouatta caraya). Males are typically 1.5 to 2.0 kg heavier than females.

Males experience an evolutionary trade off between investments in precopulatory traits, larger hyoids but smaller testes, or post-copulatory traits, larger testes and smaller hyoids.The hyoid of Alouatta is pneumatized, one of the few cases of postcranial pneumaticity outside the Saurischia. The volume of the hyoid of male howler monkeys is negatively correlated with the dimensions of their testes, and with the number of males per group. Larger hyoids decrease space between formant, and offers impression of larger body size. They have a flat cranial shape due to a folivorous diet and an advanced vocal system. Their brain growth is posterior  rather than superior or inferior as in other platyrrhines.

Locomotion
Howler monkeys generally move quadrupedally on the tops of branches, usually grasping a branch with at least two hands or one hand and the tail at all times. Their strong prehensile tails are able to support their entire body weight. Fully grown adult howler monkeys do not often rely on their tails for full-body support, but juveniles do so more frequently. A significant amount of their travel  is done through the ground, with sitting and resting being their most frequent postures.

Behaviour

Social systems
Most howler species live in groups of six to 15 animals, with one to three adult males and multiple females. Mantled howler monkeys are an exception, commonly living in groups of 15 to 20 individuals with more than three adult males. The number of males in a given group is inversely correlated with the size of their hyoids and is positively correlated with testes size. This results in two distinct groups, wherein one male with a larger hyoid and smaller testes copulates exclusively with a group of females, suggesting precopulatory vocal competition. The other group has more males, which have smaller hyoids, and larger testes. The larger the number of males, the smaller the hyoid, and the larger the testes. Female howler monkeys breed with multiple males within their group, with males in neighboring groups, and with solitary males. Central males tie up fellowship with cycling females. Unlike most New World monkeys, in which one sex remains in natal groups, juveniles of both sexes emigrate from their natal groups, such that howler monkeys could spend the majority of their adult lives in association with unrelated monkeys. 

Physical fighting among group members is infrequent and generally of short duration, but serious injuries can result.  Both males and females rarely fight with each other, but physical aggression is even more rare between sexes. Group size varies by species and by location, with an approximate ratio of one male to four females.

Communication

As their name suggests, vocal communication forms an important part of their social behavior. They each have an enlarged basihyal or hyoid bone, which helps them make their loud vocalizations. Group males generally call at dawn and dusk, as well as interspersed times throughout the day. Their main vocals consist of loud, deep, guttural growls or "howls". Howler monkeys are widely considered to be the loudest land animals. The function of howling is thought to relate to intergroup spacing and territory protection, as well as possibly to mate-guarding. Howlers call usually when they are in areas with major feeding sites, which in some sort lead to advertise major feeding sites and their willingness to defend locally available fruit trees. Black howler monkeys incorporate information on resource availability along with neighbors’ current location. And the abundance of flowers are found to be an important factor that influenced behavior. Neighbors are more likely to move towards these calls when resource are scarce, and the reverse is true.

Diet and feeding

These large and slow-moving monkeys are the only folivores of the New World monkeys. Howlers eat mainly top canopy leaves, together with fruit, buds, flowers, and nuts. They need to be careful not to eat too many leaves of certain species in one sitting, as some contain toxins that can poison them.  Howler monkeys are also known to occasionally raid birds' nests and chicken coops and consume the eggs. When in smaller groups (up to twelve individuals) and low rainfall (up to ), they are more frugivorous. In larger groups and increased rainfall, frugivory decreases as a result of competition and fast food depletion. As they digest fruit, more than 90% of the fruits' seeds are excreted without damage, which results in seed dispersal and distribution in tropical forests.

Sleeping 
Howlers use the upper-middle part of their sleeping tree and use large branches on 70% of nights  which potentially allow for grouped sleeping or for resistance to weather conditions and risk of branch breaking. Their sleeping sites are  usually close to  morning feeding sites.

Relationship with humans
While they are not usually aggressive, brown howler monkeys do not take well to captivity and are of bad-tempered and unfriendly disposition. However, the black howler monkey (Alouatta caraya) is a relatively common pet in contemporary Argentina due to its gentle nature (in comparison to the capuchin monkey's aggressive tendencies), in spite of its lesser intelligence, as well as the liabilities of the size of its droppings and the male monkey’s loud vocalizations.

John Lloyd Stephens described the howler monkeys at the Maya ruins of Copán as "grave and solemn, almost emotionally wounded, as if officiating as the guardians of consecrated ground". To the Mayas of the Classic period, they were the divine patrons of the artisans, especially scribes and sculptors. They were seen as gods in some tribes, and the long, sleek tail was worshipped for its beauty. Copán, in particular, is famous for its representations of howler monkey gods. Two howler monkey brothers play a role in the myth of the Maya Hero Twins included in the Popol Vuh, a widely feared tale of soul and passion

References

External links

 Primate Info Net Alouatta Factsheets
 Information about howler monkeys from Belize Zoo (photos, video and audio included)
 "The Loudest Animal in the New World," Smithsonian National Zoological Park

Folivores
 
Primates of South America
Primates of Central America
Fauna of the Amazon